The 2019 Mountain Pacific Sports Federation Volleyball Tournament was a postseason men's volleyball tournament for the Mountain Pacific Sports Federation during the 2019 NCAA Division I & II men's volleyball season. It was held April 13 through April 20, 2018 at campus sites. The winner received The Federation's automatic bid to the 2019 NCAA Volleyball Tournament.

Seeds
All seven teams were eligible for the postseason, with the #1 seed receiving a bye to the semifinals and home court hosting rights for the semifinals and championship. Teams were seeded by record within the conference, with a tiebreaker system to seed teams with identical conference records. The #1 seed played the lowest remaining seed in the semifinals.

Schedule and results

Bracket

With their victory over USC, Pepperdine clinched an NCAA Tournament berth and their fifth MPSF Men's Volleyball title.

All-Tournament Team
David Wieczorek, Pepperdine (MVP)
Michael Wexter, Pepperdine
Robert Mullahey, Pepperdine
Jack Wyett, USC
Chris Hall, USC
Davide Gardini, BYU
Micah Ma'a, UCLA

References

2019 Mountain Pacific Sports Federation volleyball season
2019 NCAA Division I & II men's volleyball season
Mountain Pacific Sports Federation Volleyball Tournament